Diwan Bahadur Muthiah Chidambaram Pethachi Chettiar (1889–1924) was an Indian administrator who served as the second zamindar of Andipatti, succeeding his father S. Rm. M. Chidambaram Chettiar.

References 

 

1889 births
1924 deaths
Dewan Bahadurs